Amyx is a surname. Notable people with the surname include:

Darrell A. Amyx (1911–1997), American archaeologist 
Fleming Amyx, American politician
Jay S. Amyx (1923–2014), American politician
Mike Amyx, American politician
Raleigh DeGeer Amyx (1938–2019), American FBI agent and Americana collector